This is a list of deputy finance ministers of Germany, who since 1967 come in two types: the Parliamentary State Secretaries, appointed by the parliament, and the Civil Service State Secretary (Beamtete Staatssekretäre), who have civil service status.

Deputy Finance Ministers

Parliamentary State Secretaries 
 1967–1969: Albert Leicht (CDU)
 1969–1971: Gerhard Reischl (SPD)
 1971–1974: Hans Hermsdorf (SPD)
 1972–1974: Konrad Porzner (SPD)
 1974–1982: Karl Haehser (SPD)
 1975–1978: Rainer Offergeld (SPD)
 1978–1982: Rolf Böhme (SPD)
 1982: Gunter Huonker (SPD)
 1982–1989: Hansjörg Häfele (CDU)
 1982–1990: Friedrich Voss (CSU)
 1989–1993: Manfred Carstens (CDU)
 1990–1994: Joachim Grünewald (CDU)
 1993–1994: Jürgen Echternach (CDU)
 1994–1998: Irmgard Karwatzki (CDU)
 1994–1995: Kurt Faltlhauser (CSU)
 1995–1998: Hansgeorg Hauser (CSU)
 1998–2007: Barbara Hendricks (SPD)
 1998–2009: Karl Diller (SPD)
 2007–2009: Nicolette Kressl (SPD)
 since 2009: Steffen Kampeter (CDU)
 since 2009: Hartmut Koschyk (CSU)

Civil Service State Secretaries 
 1949–1959: Alfred Hartmann
 1959–1962: Karl Maria Hettlage
 1963–1969: Walter Grund
 1967–1969: Karl Maria Hettlage
 1969–1972: Hans Georg Emde (FDP)
 1970–1972: Heinz Haller
 1973–1977: Karl Otto Pöhl
 1973–1974: Manfred Schüler
 1974–1978: Joachim Hiehle
 1977–1980: Manfred Lahnstein (SPD)
 1978–1989: Günter Obert
 1981–1982: Horst Schulmann
 1982–1989: Hans Tietmeyer
 1989–1993: Peter Klemm
 1990–1993: Horst Köhler (CDU)
 1991–1995: Franz-Christoph Zeitler
 1993–2004: Manfred Overhaus
 1993–1994: Gert Haller
 1994–1998: Jürgen Stark
 1998–1999: Heiner Flassbeck
 1998–1999: Claus Noé
 1999–2002: Heribert Zitzelsberger
 1999–2005: Caio Koch-Weser
 2002–2006: Volker Halsch (SPD)
 2004–2005: Gerd Ehlers
 2005–2008: Thomas Mirow (SPD)
 since 2005: Werner Gatzer
 2005–2009: Axel Nawrath
 since 2008: Jörg Asmussen
 2009–2010: Walther Otremba
 since 2010: Hans Bernhard Beus

See also 
 List of German finance ministers

Sources 
 Website of the German Federal Finance Ministry

Deputy finance ministers